Andrew Thomas Griffith John (called Andy; born 9 January 1964) is the current Archbishop of Wales, of the Church in Wales. He became the Bishop of Bangor in 2008 and was appointed archbishop in 2021.

Early life
A native of Aberystwyth, John attended Ysgol Penglais before studying law at the University of Wales, Cardiff. After graduating in 1986, he studied theology at the University of Nottingham, graduating in 1988, followed by a diploma in pastoral studies at St John's College, Nottingham in 1989.

Ordained ministry
He was ordained deacon in the Diocese of St David's and a priest in 1990.  Until his election as Bishop of Bangor, all his ministry was in the Diocese of St David's.  Initially he was curate for Cardigan, Y Ferwig and Mwnt from 1989 to 1991 and then in Aberystwyth from 1991 to 1992.  He was a vicar in the Rectorial Benefice of Aberystwyth from 1992 to 1999.  From 1999 he was vicar of Henfynyw with Aberaeron and Llanddewi Aberarth, to which was added Llanbadarn Trefeglwys in 2005.  In 2006 he was appointed vicar of Pencarreg and Llanycrwys and the Archdeacon of Cardigan.

Episcopal ministry
John was elected Bishop of Bangor on 9 October 2008 and was consecrated in Llandaff Cathedral on 29 November 2008, along with the new Bishop of St David's, Wyn Evans. He was enthroned in Bangor Cathedral on 24 January 2009.

On 6 December 2021, John was elected to serve as Archbishop of Wales (remaining Bishop of Bangor) by an Electoral College of the Church in Wales meeting at Holy Trinity Church, Llandrindod Wells; his election was confirmed (and therefore he legally took up the archiepiscopal See) immediately. He was formally enthroned as Archbishop of Wales on 30 April 2022.

Views 
John identifies himself with the Evangelical tradition of Anglicanism. However, some of his actions and views also align with Catholicism and liberalism. 

John is a supporter of Welsh independence in order to "solve" Wales' problems adding, "Of all the options before us, what is the option that has the best chance of solving the problems?"

Personal life 
He has four children with his first wife, Reverend Caroline John. He has now remarried.

References

1964 births
People from Penparcau
21st-century bishops of the Church in Wales
Alumni of Cardiff University
Alumni of the University of Nottingham
Archdeacons of Cardigan
Bishops of Bangor
Archbishops of Wales
Living people
People from Aberystwyth
Welsh-speaking clergy
Alumni of St John's College, Nottingham
People educated at Ysgol Penglais School